William D. "Bill" LaRochelle (12 July 1926 – 29 April 2011) was a Canadian sprinter. He competed in the men's 4 × 400 metres relay at the 1948 Summer Olympics. LaRochelle played football for the Ottawa Rough Riders, Montreal Alouettes, Winnipeg Blue Bombers and Calgary Stampeders from 1949 to 1953.

References

1926 births
2011 deaths
Athletes (track and field) at the 1948 Summer Olympics
Canadian male sprinters
Canadian male hurdlers
Olympic track and field athletes of Canada
Athletes (track and field) at the 1950 British Empire Games
Commonwealth Games competitors for Canada
Ottawa Rough Riders players
Montreal Alouettes players
Winnipeg Blue Bombers players
Calgary Stampeders players